Stephen Black (March 31, 1927 – June 12, 2008) was a Canadian professional ice hockey player who played in the National Hockey League with the Detroit Red Wings and Chicago Black Hawks between 1949 and 1951. The rest of his career, which lasted from 1946 to 1954, was spent in the minor leagues. Black won the Stanley Cup with Detroit in 1950.

Junior career
Steve Black played five years for the Port Arthur Flyers of the TBJHL making two trips to the Memorial Cup Tournament before joining the Pacific Coast Hockey League (PCHL).

Professional career
In 1946 Black joined the Oakland Oaks of the PCHL and showed enough talent to move up to the American Hockey League the following season. After two years in the minors, he joined the Detroit Red Wings of the National Hockey League (NHL). The 1949–50 Wings were already deep in offensive talent with established players such as Gordie Howe, Ted Lindsay and Sid Abel, so Black was told to concentrate on the defensive aspect of the game. As his defensive skills increased, his overall game improved, and was picked to play in the 1950 NHL All Star Game. He won the Stanley Cup with the Red Wings. He started the 1951 season with Detroit before being traded to the Chicago Black Hawks. He would play 39 games for Chicago that season which would also be his last in the NHL. He played in the minor leagues for three more seasons before retiring from hockey in 1954.

Career statistics

Regular season and playoffs

Awards and achievements
 1950 Stanley Cup Championship (Detroit Red Wings)
 1950 NHL All Star (Detroit Red Wings)

References

External links
 
 Steve Black's Day with the Stanley Cup

1927 births
2008 deaths
Calgary Stampeders (WHL) players
Canadian ice hockey left wingers
Chicago Blackhawks players
Detroit Red Wings players
Ice hockey people from Ontario
Indianapolis Capitals players
Milwaukee Sea Gulls players
Oakland Oaks (PCHL) players
St. Louis Flyers players
Sportspeople from Thunder Bay
Stanley Cup champions